

406001–406100 

|-bgcolor=#f2f2f2
| colspan=4 align=center | 
|}

406101–406200 

|-bgcolor=#f2f2f2
| colspan=4 align=center | 
|}

406201–406300 

|-bgcolor=#f2f2f2
| colspan=4 align=center | 
|}

406301–406400 

|-id=308
| 406308 Nanwai ||  || The Nanjing Foreign Language School (Nanwai), one of the first seven foreign language schools in China, was founded in 1963. With the mission "to educate forward-thinking students with a Chinese soul and global vision", Nanwai provides a student-based education, which encourages well-rounded and unconstrained student development. || 
|}

406401–406500 

|-bgcolor=#f2f2f2
| colspan=4 align=center | 
|}

406501–406600 

|-bgcolor=#f2f2f2
| colspan=4 align=center | 
|}

406601–406700 

|-bgcolor=#f2f2f2
| colspan=4 align=center | 
|}

406701–406800 

|-id=737
| 406737 Davet ||  || Stéphane Davet (born 1977) is a Swiss physicist and teacher in the Canton of Valais. He is an amateur astronomer and an active member of Astrochablais. He has been the president of the Commission Romande de Physique for many years. || 
|}

406801–406900 

|-bgcolor=#f2f2f2
| colspan=4 align=center | 
|}

406901–407000 

|-id=957
| 406957 Kochetova ||  || Oľga Kochetova (born 1954), a staff scientist at the Institute of Applied Astronomy of the Russian Academy of Sciences. || 
|}

References 

406001-407000